The Czech Republic is a nation that has competed at the Hopman Cup tournament on ten occasions, first competing at the 5th Hopman Cup in 1993. They have won the title on two occasions: in 1994 and in 2012.

Before its dissolution, the Czech Republic used to form part of Czechoslovakia which competed at the first four Hopman Cups, from 1989 until 1992.

Players
This is a list of players who have played for the Czech Republic in the Hopman Cup.

Results

1 In 2012, in the round robin tie against Denmark and in the final against France, the dead mixed doubles rubbers were not played.

References

See also
Czechoslovakia at the Hopman Cup

Hopman Cup teams
Hopman Cup
Hopman Cup